The 2022 ERA Championship, formally known as the 2022 Electric Racing Academy Championship was a motor racing championship for open wheel, all-electric formula racing cars. This was the inaugural season of the championship. It was scheduled to be run over five double-header rounds and starts on 10 June at Hungaroring.

Teams and drivers 
All drivers competed with identical Mitsu-Bachi F110E chassis based on the Dome F110 Formula 4 chassis, powered by a 130KW motor, with a 24KWh battery and Goodyear tires.

Race calendar 
On 14 January, the provisional calendar was announced. The series supported the 2022 FIA ETCR - eTouring Car World Cup at all of its races. On 22 February 2022, it was announced that Istanbul Park would host the first round instead of the Istanbul Street Circuit. On 17 May, it was announced that Istanbul FIA ETCR round was postponed to November due to the organizational issues, so Istanbul ERA round was also postponed. Only practice sessions were held at Hungaroring and Circuito del Jarama. The round of the championship at Vallelunga Circuit was cancelled on 19 July due to logistical problems.

Championship standings

Points were awarded to the top 10 classified finishers in each race.

Drivers' Championship

See also 

 Electric Motorsport

External links

References 

ERA Championship
ERA Championship
ERA Championship